Robert Marguesse Miller (December 11, 1929 - August 7, 2006) was an American football offensive/defensive tackle with the Detroit Lions of the National Football League from 1952 to 1958.

Born in Norwalk, Connecticut, he attended the University of Virginia, which finished 8-1 and ranked 13th in the Associated Press poll in his final year in 1951.

After being selected by Detroit in the 1952 NFL Draft, he was on the teams which won NFL championships in 1952, 1953 and 1957, and also the team which lost the title game in 1954. He was selected an all-conference defensive tackle in 1956 by The Sporting News. After retiring from football, he was the president and owner of Cavalier Manufacturing.  In the 1970s he became a licensed horse trainer, breeder and owner of thoroughbred racing stable Del-Rob Farm along with his wife Delphine (the Del in Del-Rob). Delphine recently passed on August 4, 2018 at the age of 89 of natural causes.

He died of cancer at age 76 in Clarkston, Michigan.

He was inducted into the Virginia Sports Hall of Fame in 2006.

References

External links

1929 births
2006 deaths
Sportspeople from Norwalk, Connecticut
Players of American football from Connecticut
American football defensive tackles
American football offensive tackles
Virginia Cavaliers football players
Detroit Lions players
People from Clarkston, Michigan
Deaths from cancer in Michigan